Victor Andrew Nankervis (17 November 1918 – 5 October 1985) was an Australian rules footballer who played with Geelong, Footscray, St Kilda and South Melbourne in the Victorian Football League (VFL) during the 1940s.

Nankervis enlisted in 1940 and due to his commitments with the Australian Army would initially only appear sporadically in the VFL. He played for three clubs in his first three seasons, for a total of 11 games.

A rover, he returned to his original club, Geelong, in 1944 and made 12 appearances. The following year he had his best season, with 43 goals from 19 games. His goals tally included seven in a game against Footscray and was enough to top Geelong's goal-kicking.

He was the son of Geelong footballer Stephen Nankervis.

References

1918 births
Australian rules footballers from Victoria (Australia)
Geelong Football Club players
Western Bulldogs players
St Kilda Football Club players
Sydney Swans players
1985 deaths
Australian Army personnel of World War II